

NGC 7662 (also known as the Blue Snowball Nebula, Snowball Nebula, and Caldwell 22) is a planetary nebula located  in the constellation Andromeda.

NGC 7662 is a popular planetary nebula for casual observers. A small telescope will reveal a star-like object with slight nebulosity. A 6" telescope with a magnification around 100x will reveal a slightly bluish disk, while telescopes with a primary mirror at least 16" in diameter may reveal slight color and brightness variations in the interior.

The central star of the planetary nebula is an subdwarfO star with a spectral type of sdO.

Image gallery

See also
 NGC 2022, which resembles NGC 7662
 NGC 2392
 NGC 3242
 List of NGC objects
 Planetary nebulae

References

External links
 
 

Planetary nebulae
Andromeda (constellation)
7662
022b
17841006